A financial literacy curriculum is a curriculum that teaches basic financial skills (known as financial literacy) to students of various age groups. Some curricula are age-specific, while others are intended for all ages. For example, Money Smart for Young Adults is a financial literacy curriculum developed by the U.S. Federal Deposit Insurance Corporation, designed for students between the ages of 12 and 20. Money Smart for Young Adults focuses on saving, debt, and home-ownership, along with a series of Money Smart Parent/ Caregiver Guides. Money Smart for Young Adults does not currently offer an investing module.Over the years, financial literacy has been recognized as an important skill to have.

The UK Scout Association introduced a "Money Skills Activity Badge" for cubs in June 2021, which includes skills in using foreign currency, budgeting and expenditure decision-making.

References

Curricula
Personal finance education